HMS Boyne was a 98-gun second rate ship of the line of the Royal Navy, built by Nicholas Diddams at Portsmouth Dockyard and launched on 3 July 1810 at Portsmouth. On 12 February 1814 she took part with HMS Caledonia in a hot action against the French line-of-battle ship Romulus off Toulon; the French 74 managed to escape to Toulon by sailing close to the coast to avoid being surrounded.  With the 1817 changes to the rating system Boyne was rerated as a 104-gun first rate ship.

On 23 November 1824, Boyne was driven ashore at Portsmouth during a gale.  In 1826 she was cut down (razeed) to become a two-deck, 76-gun third-rate ship of the line.  On 1 December 1834 she was renamed HMS Excellent and became a training ship. On 22 November 1859 she was renamed HMS Queen Charlotte and paid off the following month before being broken up from December 1861.

Notes

References

 Lambert, Andrew (2012). The Challenge: Britain Against America in the Naval War of 1812. London: Faber and Faber. 
 Lavery, Brian (2003) The Ship of the Line - Volume 1: The development of the battlefleet 1650–1850. Conway Maritime Press. .
 Winfield, Rif (2008): British Warships in the Age of Sail: 1793 - 1817. Seaforth Publishing. .

External links
 

Ships of the line of the Royal Navy
Boyne-class ships of the line (1810)
Ships built in Portsmouth
1810 ships
War of 1812 ships of the United Kingdom
Maritime incidents in November 1824